is a 1990 OVA chanbara film directed by an uncredited Osamu Dezaki, who was credited as storyboard artist under the alias "Tsutomu Dezaki". The film is based on a series of novels by Takeshi Narumi.

Sword for Truth was released to a largely negative reception in the United Kingdom and the United States, where it was marketed by Manga Entertainment in lieu of their successful release of Ninja Scroll.

Plot
Shuranosuke Sakaki, a ronin who wears the mark of two crossed scythes, is hired by the Nakura Clan to rescue Princess Mayu from the Seki Ninja. During his quest, he faces the Seki Ninja's deadliest assassins as he attempts to rescue her. Meanwhile, Marouji, an assassin who kills his targets with his jujutsu skills also carries out his own missions. Sakaki succeeds in rescuing Princess Mayu, but on their return, Lord Daizen orders the execution of Sakaki to hide his involvement with the princess. However, Princess Mayu stops the execution before she suddenly collapses, coughing up blood after being poisoned by the Seki Ninja. Sakaki refuses his reward and leaves the Nakura Clan in disgust. Later, Sakaki crosses paths with the assassin Marouji, both with the strong smell of blood about them.

Cast

References

External links

Magic Bus (studio)
Ninja in anime and manga
Samurai in anime and manga
Toei Animation original video animation